"" ("Were God not with us at this time") is a Lutheran hymn, with words written by Martin Luther based on the Psalm 124. The hymn in three stanzas of seven lines each was first published in 1524. It was translated to English and has appeared in 20 hymnals. The hymn formed the base of several compositions, including chorale cantatas by Buxtehude and Bach.

History 
Luther wrote "" as a paraphrase of Psalm 124 in three stanzas of seven lines each. It was first printed in 1524 in Johann Walter's Eyn geystlich Gesangk Buchleyn. It was translated to English and has appeared in 20 hymnals.

Lyrics

Melodies and settings 
When the hymn was first published in 1524 in the Eyn geystlich Gesangk Buchleyn, it was associated with a hymn tune in Doric mode, Zahn No. 4434, which was also used for "Wo Gott der Herr nicht bei uns hält", a paraphrase of the same psalm by Justus Jonas in eight stanzas. Luther had a tendency to retain traditional texts and melodies. In 1537, the hymn was printed again with a different tune by Walter, Zahn No. 4435. The second melody has been regarded as an improvement and became the standard in further publications.

Dieterich Buxtehude set the hymn as a chorale cantata, BuxWV 102, for choir, two violins and continuo. Johann Sebastian Bach composed a chorale cantata, Wär Gott nicht mit uns diese Zeit, BWV 14, in 1725 for the fourth Sunday after Epiphany. In this cantata he uses the Zahn 4434 tune. For "Wär Gott nicht mit uns diese Zeit", BWV 257, one of his four-part chorales, he used the Zahn 4441a melody, one of the hymn tunes composed for "Wo Gott der Herr nicht bei uns hält".

In the Protestant hymnal Evangelisches Gesangbuch, EG 297 combines under the title "Wo Gott der Herr nicht bei uns hält" stanzas from both paraphrases of Psalm 124, taking stanzas 1, 2, 5 and 6 from Jonas (5 from 6, 6 from 8 in the original hymn), and Luther's second and third stanza as stanzas 3 and 4."

See also 
 List of hymns by Martin Luther

References

Bibliography 
 
 
 
 
 
 
  Preface in English and German.

External links 
 Wär Gott nicht mit uns diese Zeit deutsche-digitale-bibliothek.de
 BWV 14.5 bach-chorales.com

16th-century hymns in German
Lutheran hymns based on Psalms
Hymn tunes
Hymns by Martin Luther
1524 works